Tshireletso is a surname. Notable people with the surname include:

Botlogile Tshireletso, Motswana politician
Leutlwetse Tshireletso (born 1985), Motswana footballer and coach
Lemponye Tshireletso (born 1984), Motswana footballer

Surnames of African origin